James Westfall is a jazz vibraphonist and keyboardist born in Houston, Texas.

He began on violin at age 6 before moving to piano and then percussion. He became interested in vibraphone due in part to his grandfather. (Who learned the instrument during the great depression). He later moved to New Orleans where he attended the University of New Orleans. In New Orleans he studied under Terence Blanchard, Harold Battiste, Steve Masakowski and Ellis Marsalis Jr. Later he moved to Los Angeles, California where he was part of the Thelonious Monk Institute of Jazz. At present he lives in Nashville working as a studio musician.

Westfall is also a founding member of The Wee Trio.

Discography
 Capitol Diner Vol. 1 with the Wee Trio (Bionic, 2007)
 Capitol Diner Vol. 2 with the Wee Trio (Bionic, 2010)
 Ashes to Ashes with the Wee Trio  (Bionic, 2012)
 Wee + 3 with the Wee Trio (Bionic, 2016)

As sideman
 Sasha Masakowski, Wishes (Hypersoul, 2011)

References

External links
All About Jazz musician profile
James Westfall's website

American jazz vibraphonists
People from Houston
Living people
1981 births
Jazz musicians from Texas